Tatiana Palacios Chapa (born 12 December 1968), known mononymously as Tatiana, is a Mexican actress, singer and television presenter. She has been nominated for five Latin Grammy Awards for Best Children's Album and has sold over 9 million records.

Early life
Tatiana was born on 12 December 1968 in Philadelphia, while her father was attending the University of Pennsylvania. A dual citizen of the United States and Mexico, Tatiana was raised in Monterrey, Mexico, by her parents, Dr. José Ramón Palacios Ortega and Diana Perla Chapa de Palacios, after her father's studies were completed in Pennsylvania.

Early career and pop music
Tatiana's first major musical project was as the character Jane in the 1984 live stage performance, Kuman, a Mexican rock opera about a Tarzan-like character. The show's 1984 album soundtrack also entitled Kuman was released under the group name, Cristal y Acero ‒ the rock trio consisting of guitarist Icar Smith, bassist Carlos Ortega, and drummer Samuel Shapiro.

From 1984 to 1994, Tatiana released 10 pop music albums which garnered numerous hits throughout Mexico and some parts of  Latin America.

Career as children's entertainer 
In 1995, Tatiana began releasing children's music albums.

From 1997 to 2001, Tatiana hosted the children's television show, El Espacio de Tatiana, on the Mexican network Televisa. She would later host another children's television show, El Show De Tatiana, on TV Azteca. She had also performed voice-over work and recorded soundtrack songs for various television and film projects produced by The Walt Disney Company. She provided her voice to the character Megara in the Latin American Spanish dub of Disney's Hercules (1997).

In 2004, she appeared as the character Coral on the Mexican telenovela, Amy, la niña de la mochila azul.

In 2016, she returned to Televisa, appearing in programs such as Hoy and Recuerda y Gana

Return to pop music
In 2005, she released her first non-children's album in over a decade entitled Acústico – Mil Gracias, an unplugged acoustic album with renditions of some of her earlier pop hits as well a number of new songs including two in English.

Her 2007 tour had 56 sold-out concerts, and her subsequent 2008 tour, Espapirifárctico, covered 64 concert dates throughout five countries.

Select discography

Pop music

1984: Tatiana
1986: Chicas de Hoy
1987: Baila Conmigo
1988: Un Lobo En La Noche
1989: Las Cosas Que He Visto
1990: Vientos de Libertad
1992: Leyes del Corazón
1994: Un Alma Desnuda
2005: Acústico – Mil Gracias
2014: Reencuentro Conmigo

Children's music
1995: Brinca
1996: Brinca II
1996: Navidad Con Tatiana
1997: Sigue La Magia
1997: Navidad Mágia
1998: Superfantástico
1999: Vamos A Jugar
1999: Navidad Mágica 2
2000: Acapulco Rock
2002: Los Mejores Temas De Las Películas De Walt Disney Vol. 1
2003: Los Mejores Temas De Las Películas De Walt Disney Vol. 2
2003: El Regalo 1
2005: El Regalo 2
2006: Aventuras En Tatilandia
2006: Tu Regalo De Navidad
2007: Espapirifáctico
2009: Te Quiero
2011: El Mundo De Tatiana
2012: Llegó Navidad
2015: Salta Sin Parar
2021: Kidsongs Vol. 1

Other
1984: Cristal y Acero ‒ Kuman

References

External links
 
 Tatiana at YouTube

1968 births
Mexican film actresses
Mexican telenovela actresses
Mexican women singers
Mexican child singers
Mexican television presenters
People from Monterrey
Living people
Musicians from Philadelphia
American emigrants to Mexico
Mexican women television presenters
Women in Latin music